Republic of the Congo–Turkey relations are foreign relations between the Republic of the Congo and Turkey. Turkey has an embassy in Brazzaville since 2013. Congo opened an embassy in Ankara in 2013.

Diplomatic Relations 
Following independence, Turkey was one of the first to establish diplomatic relations with Congo. Turkey, through mainly TIKA launched many programs, worth US$ 57 million in economic aid during the next 30 years.

Following the visit by President Denis Sassou Nguesso, bilateral relations became much closer.

Presidential Visits

Economic Relations 
 Trade volume between the two countries was 57.25 million USD in 2018 (Turkish exports/imports: 55.79/1.47 million USD).
 There are direct flights from Istanbul to Point-Noire since July 30, 2019.

Educational Relations 
 Turkish Maarif Foundation runs schools in Congo.

See also 

 Foreign relations of the Republic of the Congo
 Foreign relations of Turkey

References 

Republic of the Congo–Turkey relations
Turkey
Bilateral relations of Turkey